José Alberto Pérez Oquendo (born 15 September 1999) is a Cuban professional football player who plays for FC Ciudad de La Habana.

Club career 
José Pérez made his professional debut for Cuba on the 12 Octobre 2019 in a CONCACAF Nations League A loss against the United States.

References

External links

1999 births
Living people
Cuban footballers
Cuba youth international footballers
Association football midfielders
FC Ciudad de La Habana players
21st-century Cuban people